Colonia Manuel González is a locality in the state of Veracruz, Mexico. It is the seat of Zentla Municipality. It has an area of 241 km2.

It has an elevation of 950 meters above mean sea level.

In 1884, it was founded with the name of "Colonia Manuel González" by Italian immigrants coming mainly from the north such as Veneto, Friuli, Piedmont, Lombardia, and some southerners like Abruzzo, Sicily and Calabria.  Every summer they celebrate the arrival of the Italian immigrant community. In 1926, Zentla was established as a city. The main economic activities in Zentla are  agriculture, the sugar industry, and fishing. Zentla is known for its piloncillo production.  The main festival is the "day of sugar" in May.

References

External links 
 http://www.microrregiones.gob.mx/catloc/contenido.aspx?refnac=302000001

Populated places in Veracruz